Chone is a genus of polychaetes belonging to the family Sabellidae.

The genus has cosmopolitan distribution.

Species:

Chone aurantiaca 
Chone costulata 
Chone duneri 
Chone eteonicola 
Chone fauveli 
Chone filicaudata 
Chone gracilis 
Chone heterochaeta 
Chone infundibuliformis 
Chone ingeloreae 
Chone kroyerii 
Chone letterstedti 
Chone magna 
Chone megalova 
Chone minuta 
Chone mollis 
Chone murmanica 
Chone oculata 
Chone orensanzi 
Chone paucibranchiata 
Chone picta 
Chone rosea 
Chone striata 
Chone ungavana

References

Annelids